A Coast Guard City is a United States municipality designated as such by the Commandant of the United States Coast Guard on application of the local civilian government. It is an honorary designation intended to recognize communities of special importance to the U.S. Coast Guard.

Criteria
Designation as a Coast Guard City is made by the Commandant of the United States Coast Guard on advise of a review board and upon application by a municipal government.  According to the U.S. Coast Guard, applications are expected to demonstrate an applicant jurisdiction's ability to meet a multi-part criteria that can include: erection of monuments and memorials to the Coast Guard, organization of civic celebrations on the anniversary of the founding of the U.S. Coast Guard, offer of special recognition and merchandise discounts to Coast Guard personnel by the local business community, providing support to local U.S. Coast Guard Morale, Welfare and Recreation initiatives.

Designation as a Coast Guard City is for a five-year period, but can be renewed indefinitely conditioned on the city continuing to meet the criteria.

History

Background
The Coast Guard City program was established by the United States Congress in 1998 to recognize cities where military assets of the United States Coast Guard  are located and which demonstrate support to Coast Guard personnel stationed there. The first city so designated was Grand Haven, Michigan.

As of February 2017, 21 cities have been designated as "Coast Guard Cities."

Legislation
The authorizing legislation for the Coast Guard City program provides that:
The Commandant of the Coast Guard may recognize the community of Grand Haven, Michigan, as "Coast Guard City, USA". If the Commandant desires to recognize any other community in the same manner or any other community requests such recognition from the Coast Guard, the Commandant shall notify the Committee on Commerce, Science, and Transportation of the Senate and the Committee on Transportation and Infrastructure of the House of Representatives 90 days prior to approving such recognition.

List of Coast Guard Cities

See also
 Military town

References

Cities in the United States
United States Coast Guard
Cities by type